Janne Pekka Ryynänen (born 1988 in Rovaniemi) is a Finnish Nordic combined athlete who has been competing since 2003. His ski club is Ounasvaaran hiihtoseura. One of his greatest achievements include a gold medal from 4 x 5 km team competition at Sapporo 2007, where he had the longest jump of the Finnish team. Ryynänen best individual finish was fourth in the 10 km individual large hill event at Liberec in 2009.

Ryynänen's best finish at the Winter Olympics was seventh in the 4 x 5 km team event at Vancouver in 2010 while his best individual finish was 12th in the 10 km individual large hill event at those same games.

His lone World Cup victory was at a 4 x 5 km team event at Italy in 2007 while his best individual finish was second in Finland twice, both in 2008.

References

 

1988 births
Finnish male Nordic combined skiers
Living people
Nordic combined skiers at the 2006 Winter Olympics
Nordic combined skiers at the 2010 Winter Olympics
Nordic combined skiers at the 2014 Winter Olympics
Olympic Nordic combined skiers of Finland
People from Rovaniemi
FIS Nordic World Ski Championships medalists in Nordic combined
Sportspeople from Lapland (Finland)
21st-century Finnish people